Stefan Mokrzecki of Ostoja coat of arms (1862–1932) was a general in the Russian Army and the Polish Army. During Polish-Soviet War commanded 8 DP and other units. Later member of armed forces of Republic of Central Lithuania. Retired in 1925. He was brother of Adam Mokrzecki that also was a general in Russian army to end as general of Polish army. He was born in Dzitryki, now in Belarus.

Recognitions 

 Krzyż Komandorski Orderu Odrodzenia Polski (2 maja 1923)
 Cross of Valour (Poland) (1921)
 Cross for duties in favour of Lithuanian Army (1926)
 Order of st. George (Russia)|Order św. Jerzego 1914
 Order of Sant Anna, 2nd and 3rd class

See also 

 Ostoja coat of arms
 Clan of Ostoja

References

References
Janusz Odziemkowski, Leksykon Wojny Polsko-Rosyjskiej 1919-1920, Oficyna Wydawnica RYTM, 2004, p. 220

1862 births
1932 deaths
People from Lida District
Polish generals
Clan of Ostoja
Military personnel of the Russian Empire
Polish people of the Polish–Soviet War
Recipients of the Order of St. Anna, 2nd class
Recipients of the Order of St. Vladimir
Recipients of the Order of St. Anna, 3rd class